Luke Tapscott (born 28 June 1991) is an Australian rules footballer who played for the Melbourne Football Club in the Australian Football League (AFL).

Tapscott started his football for Northern Areas Football Association club Orroroo before moving to Adelaide to attend Prince Alfred College and play football for North Adelaide Football Club. One of Tapscott's Prince Alfred friends was Jack Trengove, who later became his teammate at Melbourne.

He excelled through the ranks as a tough, built, young forward/midfielder with an exceptional penetrating kick, on both the left and right foot. After twice representing South Australia at the AFL Under 18 Championships and being named in the All Australian team, he was picked as the 18th overall pick in the 2009 AFL Draft, by the Melbourne Football Club. At the time he was compared to 2009 AFL Rising Star winner Daniel Rich.

After injuring his hip in the 2010 pre-season, Tapscott missed most of the season and was unable to break into Melbourne's senior side when he did return, instead playing for Melbourne's VFL-affiliate Casey, before injuring his shoulder at the end of 2010. After an impressive 2011 pre-season, Tapscott made his AFL debut in Round One that year. Playing in a draw against Sydney, Tapscott played a "tremendous" match, gathering 19 disposals and narrowly missing out on being the AFL Rising Star nominee for round one to 's Dyson Heppell, who would eventually claim the award at the end of the season.

Tapscott was delisted at the conclusion of the 2014 AFL season.

Statistics
 Statistics are correct to the end of the 2014 season

|- style="background-color: #EAEAEA"
! scope="row" style="text-align:center" | 2010
|  || 35 || 0 || — || — || — || — || — || — || — || — || — || — || — || — || — || — 
|- 
! scope="row" style="text-align:center" | 2011
|  || 35 || 15 || 2 || 1 || 131 || 57 || 188 || 50 || 34 || 0.1 || 0.1 || 8.7 || 3.8 || 12.5 || 3.3 || 2.3
|- style="background:#eaeaea;"
! scope="row" style="text-align:center" | 2012
|  || 35 || 14 || 2 || 4 || 100 || 56 || 156 || 54 || 48 || 0.1 || 0.3 || 7.1 || 4 || 12.1 || 3.9 || 3.4
|-
! scope="row" style="text-align:center" | 2013
|  || 35 || 16 || 7 || 8 || 107 || 49 || 156 || 56 || 35 || 0.4 || 0.5 || 6.7 || 3.1 || 9.8 || 3.5 || 2.2
|- style="background:#eaeaea;"
! scope="row" style="text-align:center" | 2014
|  || 35 || 3 || 1 || 3 || 19 || 12 || 31 || 4 || 6 || 0.3 || 1 || 6.3 || 4 || 10.3 || 1.3 || 2
|- class="sortbottom"
! colspan=3| Career
! 48
! 12
! 16
! 357
! 174
! 531
! 164
! 123
! 0.3
! 0.3
! 7.5
! 3.6
! 11.1
! 3.4
! 2.7
|}

References

External links

Draft profile by the AFL BigPond Network

Living people
1991 births
North Adelaide Football Club players
Melbourne Football Club players
Casey Demons players
Australian rules footballers from South Australia
People educated at Prince Alfred College
People from Orroroo, South Australia